Erdman is a surname. Notable people with the surname include:

Andrew L. Erdman (born 1965), American author, journalist, and scholar
Charles Erdman Petersdorff (1800–1886), legal writer
Charles R. Erdman Sr. (1866–1960), American Presbyterian minister and professor of theology at Princeton Theological Seminary
Charles R. Erdman Jr. (1897–1984), American Republican Party politician
Constantine Jacob Erdman (1846–1911), Democratic member of the U.S. House of Representatives from Pennsylvania
David V. Erdman (1911–2001), American literary critic, editor, and Professor Emeritus of English at the State University of New York at Stony Brook
Derek Erdman (born 1973), artist living in Seattle, Washington
Jacob Erdman (1801–1867), Democratic member of the U.S. House of Representatives from Pennsylvania
Jean Erdman (1916–2020), dancer and choreographer of modern dance as well as an avant-garde theater director
Jean Erdman, Baron Dieskau (1701–1767), German-born soldier remembered mostly as a French general and commander in America
Marshall Erdman (1922–1995), Lithuanian-American builder and colleague of Frank Lloyd Wright
Molly Erdman (born 1974), American actress and improvisational comedian
Nikolai Erdman (1900–1970), Soviet dramatist and screenwriter
Paul Erdman (1932–2007), one of the leading business and financial writers in the United States
Philip Erdman (born 1977), Nebraska Republican state senator from Bayard, Nebraska in the Nebraska Legislature
Richard Erdman (1925–2019), American actor and director
Richard Erdman (artist) (born 1952), American artist
Wayne Erdman (born 1952), retired Canadian judoka who represented Canada in Judo at the 1976 Summer Olympics in Montreal, Canada
Woody Erdman (1926–1997), American sportscaster, television producer and businessman

See also
Erdman Act, United States federal law pertaining to railroad labor disputes
Marshall Erdman Prefab Houses